The third and final season of American drama thriller series Quantico premiered in the United States on American Broadcasting Company (ABC) on April 26, 2018, and concluded on August 3, 2018. Produced by ABC Studios, Michael Seitzman served as the showrunner for the third and final season, subsequently replacing series creator Joshua Safran. Executive producers include Mark Gordon, Robert Sertner, Nicholas Pepper, and Jorge Zamacona. 

The third and final season consisted of thirteen episodes, down from the twenty-two episode count of the two previous seasons. The season aired on Thursdays in the United States at 10:00 pm. On May 11, 2018, after only three of the thirteen episodes in the season had aired, ABC announced that the series had canceled. On May 14, Deadline reported that the network would finish airing the remainder of the third season on Friday nights at 8:00 pm.

Overview
Three years after the events of the Constitutional Convention, former CIA analyst, Alex Parrish had to escape outside the United States in order to avoid arrest from law enforcement authorities. After living anonymously in Italy, she is forced to return to America after Ryan shared information to her about Shelby's kidnapping by a notorious international arms dealer known as The Widow. In order to save Shelby, Ryan and Alex recruit Owen and Harry to help them with their mission. Owen invites Jocelyn Turner to the team as the former FBI agent has intelligence about the arms dealer, due in part to their past history. Owing to the extreme circumstances of the covert operation, the team must retrieve Shelby at all costs, before time runs out.

Episodes

Cast

Main 
 Priyanka Chopra as Alex Parrish
 Jake McLaughlin as Ryan Booth
 Johanna Braddy as Shelby Wyatt of Booth
 Russell Tovey as Harry Doyle
 Blair Underwood as Owen Hall
 Marlee Matlin as Jocelyn Turner
 Alan Powell as Mike McQuigg

Recurring 
 Amber Skye Noyes as Celine Fox
 Vandit Bhatt as Jagdeep Patel
 Timothy V. Murphy as Conor Devlin 
 Laura Campbell as Fiona Quinn
 Lilly Englert as Maisie Doyle
 Andrea Bosca as Andrea
 Emma Gia Celotto Signirini as Isabella

Guest 
 Jay Armstrong Johnson as Will Olsen
 Jayne Houdyshell as The Widow
 Nathan Darrow as Felix Pillay
 Jamie Jackson as Gavin Pillay
 Ana Khaja as Sita Parrish 
 Erik Jensen as Damon Grosch
 Chris McKinney as Larry Reese
 Frances Turner as Chelsea Lee
 Peter Rini as Joel Akers
 Omar Maskati as Khaled
 Alexander Sokovikov as Dmitri Ivanov
 Piter Marek as Ali
 Lara Wolf as Nora
 Chuk Iwuji as Dante
 Donald Paul as Leon Riggs 
 Brayson Peter Isaya as Bray Bill Broonzy

Production

Development 

In May 2017, ABC renewed the series for a third season of 13 episodes. As part of the renewal process, Safran stepped down as showrunner of the show but remained as a consultant. The following month, it was announced that Michael Seitzman would be Quantico showrunner and Safran would be credited as an executive producer. The third season premiered on April 26, 2018.

Casting 
After the third season renewal announcement, it was reported that Yasmine Al Massri and Pearl Thusi would leave the series, and in June 2017, it was reported that Ellis and Tovey would not return as part of a creative overhaul. However, in August 2017, it was confirmed that Tovey would in fact be returning as a series regular. In late July 2017, Marlee Matlin joined the show as a series regular in the third season. She will play the role of ex-FBI agent, Jocelyn Turner. On November 21, 2017, it was announced that Alan Powell will join the show as a series regular in the third season. He will play Mike McQuigg, an undercover agent. On December 6, 2017, it was announced that Amber Skye Noyes will join the third season in the recurring role of Celine Fox. On January 17, 2018, it was announced that Vandit Bhatt will join the third season in the recurring role of Jagdeep Patel. On February 16, 2018, it was confirmed that Aunjanue Ellis has exited the series.

Filming 
Certain scenes of the third-season premiere were shot on location in Italy. Filming for the third season started on October 10, 2017. In March 2018, it was confirmed by showrunner Michael Seitzman that the last few episodes of the third season would be shot on location in Ireland. Filming for the third season ended on April 21, 2018.

Reception

Critical response

The third season received mixed feedback from critics, who were divided over its direction in comparison to its predecessors. The season premiere was poorly received. Despite praising the episode's action and pacing and its introduction of Marlee Matlin's character, Dishya Sharma of the International Business Times wrote that "it leaves you asking for more". The Quint's Dipti Kharude said that "the briskness of the episode suffocates it". Mark Perigard of the Boston Herald was critical of the season's new format and storylines, writing that it "doubles down on the dumb". During a review of the series finale, TV Fanatic's Allison Nichols praised how the season "show[ed] the team putting the pieces together", but cited the relationship between Ryan and Shelby as unbelievable and "one of the more controversial parts".

Hindu terrorist plot
The fifth episode of the season, titled "The Blood of Romeo", was criticized by some Indian social media users for its alleged anti-Indian sentiment. In the episode, Alex Parrish (Priyanka Chopra) uncovers a plot by Indian Hindu nationalists to commit a terrorist false flag attack with nuclear weapons in Manhattan, and have it blamed on Pakistan. Users had described the plotline as "ridiculous" and "unrealistic" and felt that it had damaged the image of Indians abroad. In addition, they denounced Chopra's participation in the episode as her international profile had made her a "quasi-ambassador for India in the West". Chopra apologised for any hurt caused by the episode and stated that she was a "proud Indian". ABC also apologised and defended Chopra from what they felt was unfairly aimed criticism commenting that she did not have a role in writing, directing or creating the show.

Indian-born British chef Atul Kochhar's contract at the Rang Mahal restaurant in Dubai was terminated by JW Marriott Marquis Dubai after he made comments criticising Chopra's involvement in the episode, which included allegations that Hindus had been terrorized by Islam for thousands of years. Bangladeshi-American writer Sharbari Zohra Ahmed who had previously worked on Quantico but was not involved in the writing of the episode was also targeted on social media. These attacks included threats of violence, including rape.

Ratings

References

General

External links 
 
 
 

2018 American television seasons
Quantico (TV series)
Hinduism in pop culture-related controversies
Anti-Indian sentiment